Ioseb Chakhvashvili ( born 3 August 1993) is a Georgian football midfielder who plays for KF Korabi Peshkopi in Albanian First Division.

Club career

Saba Qom
Chakhvashvili has played with Saba Qom since 2014. He made his debut in a league match against Padideh on 29 January 2015, subbed in for Mohammad Ousani. He is the second choice young player for Saba Qom.

References

1993 births
Expatriate footballers in Iran
FC Spartaki Tskhinvali players
Footballers from Georgia (country)
Expatriate sportspeople from Georgia (country) in Iran
Living people
Saba players
Association football midfielders
Expatriate sportspeople from Georgia (country) in Albania
Expatriate footballers in Albania
Expatriate footballers from Georgia (country)
Footballers from Tbilisi
KF Korabi Peshkopi players
Kategoria e Parë players
Persian Gulf Pro League players
FC Dila Gori players
Erovnuli Liga players
FC Mika players